"Kiss Me" is a song originally released in 1982 by the British band Tin Tin (sometimes written TinTin). The song was allegedly written within 24 hours after the band had signed a record deal with WEA Records. The single failed to chart in the UK Singles Chart. In 1983 it was released on Sire Records in the U.S., where it made the Billboard dance chart. The lead singer and guitarist in Tin Tin, Stephen Duffy, later re-recorded the song twice and released it as a solo single using the name of Stephen "Tin Tin" Duffy. The first re-recording was released as a single only in the West Midlands region in 1984. Another version was recorded in late 1984 and released as a single on 25 February 1985. This version peaked at number 4 in March, selling more than 250,000 copies within three weeks and thus being certified silver.

The chorus is based on a passage from the Biblical book Song of Songs.

It was the last song to be played on BBC Radio 1s MW frequency in 1994, before the station became FM only.

A new version was included on Duffy's compilation album Memory & Desire: 30 Years in the Wilderness, released in 2009 by Universal Records.

Robbie Williams version

"Kiss Me" was later recorded by UK pop singer Robbie Williams for his 2006 album Rudebox. The producer of this version was Joey Negro. On 10 October 2006, Williams' version made its debut at number 13 on the Norwegian combined downloads and singles chart on downloads alone. This version was also once featured as the Free Download of the Week on the American version of iTunes.

Charts

Tin Tin 1982–1983 versions

Stephen "Tin Tin" Duffy 1985 version
This is the version produced by Froome & Jeczalik.

Robbie Williams version

References

1982 songs
1982 debut singles
1983 singles
1984 singles
1985 singles
2006 singles
Robbie Williams songs
Songs written by Stephen Duffy
Songs about kissing
Sire Records singles
Warner Music Group singles
EMI Records singles